TSV Buchbach is a German association football club from the village of Buchbach, Bavaria. The team is part of a larger sports club that also has departments for curling, gymnastics, skiing, and tennis. The footballers are distinguished as former holders of the German record for the longest undefeated streak, a string of 75 matches from 19 August 1995 to 23 May 1998.

History
TSV was founded in 1913 as a gymnastics club. Football was soon introduced to the club by students who brought the game back from Munich. A football department was established within the association on 11 January 1930.

Following World War II, Buchbach played in local A-Class competition until slipping to B-Class play in 1960, where they would remain until returning to A ball in 1980. In the mid-1990s, with solid sponsorship in place, they began their record making unbeaten run. They advanced to play in the Landesliga Süd (V) in 2004 and a title win there in 2008 saw TSV promoted to the Bayernliga (V).

At the end of the 2011–12 season the club managed to finish in the top nine of the Bayernliga and thereby directly qualified for the new tier four Regionalliga Bayern.

In this league TSV finished sixth, fifth and fourth in the first three seasons in the league.

Honours
The club's honours:

League
 Landesliga Bayern-Süd (V)
 Champions: 2008
 Bezirksoberliga Oberbayern (VI)
 Champions: 2004
 Bezirksliga Oberbayern-Ost (VII)
 Runners-up: 2001, 2003

Recent managers
Recent managers of the club:

Recent seasons
The recent season-by-season performance of the club:

With the introduction of the Bezirksoberligas in 1988 as the new fifth tier, below the Landesligas, all leagues below dropped one tier. With the introduction of the Regionalligas in 1994 and the 3. Liga in 2008 as the new third tier, below the 2. Bundesliga, all leagues below dropped one tier. With the establishment of the Regionalliga Bayern as the new fourth tier in Bavaria in 2012 the Bayernliga was split into a northern and a southern division, the number of Landesligas expanded from three to five and the Bezirksoberligas abolished. All leagues from the Bezirksligas onwards were elevated one tier.

Unbeaten record 1995 – 1998
Following a 1–5 defeat on 14 June 1995 to FC Grünthal, which meant relegation to the C-Klasse, then the lowest league in Bavaria, for the TSV, the club started its record-breaking run of 75 unbeaten league games. In the 1995–96 season, it played 26 games in the C-Klasse Inn/Salzach – Group 4, coming first with 20 wins and six draws and earning promotion back to the B-Klasse.

The following season, the club again earned a league championship, now in the B-Klasse Inn/Salzach Group 3. In 26 games it achieved 18 wins and 8 draws. In 1997–98, the club came very close to a perfect season once more. Having again not lost in the first 23 of 26 season matches, on 24 May 1998 the team lost at home to SV Waldhausen, 1–3, ending its unbeaten run. Nevertheless, promotion was once more achieved. The record held until 2006 when it was taken by BSG Stahl Riesa with in the end 78 league matches without a defeat.

References

External links
Official team site
 TSV Buchbach at Weltfussball.de

Football clubs in Germany
Football clubs in Bavaria
Association football clubs established in 1930
Football in Upper Bavaria
Sports clubs established in 1913
1913 establishments in Germany
Mühldorf (district)